The 84th New York State Legislature, consisting of the New York State Senate and the New York State Assembly, met from January 1 to April 16, 1861, during the third year of Edwin D. Morgan's governorship, in Albany.

Background
Under the provisions of the New York Constitution of 1846, 32 Senators and 128 assemblymen were elected in single-seat districts; senators for a two-year term, assemblymen for a one-year term. The senatorial districts were made up of entire counties, except New York County (four districts) and Kings County (two districts). The Assembly districts were made up of entire towns, or city wards, forming a contiguous area, all within the same county.

At this time there were two major political parties: the Republican Party and the Democratic Party. The Democrats split over the slavery issue and presidential nomination. Two State tickets were nominated, one supporting Stephen A. Douglas for president, the other supporting John C. Breckinridge.

Elections
The New York state election, 1860 was held on November 6. Gov. Edwin D. Morgan and Lt. Gov. Robert Campbell (both Rep.) were re-elected. The other two statewide elective offices were also carried by the Republicans. The approximate party strength at this election, as expressed by the vote for Governor was: Republican 358,000; Douglas Democratic 294,000; and Breckinridge Democratic 19,000.

Sessions
The Legislature met for the regular session at the Old State Capitol in Albany on January 1, 1861; and adjourned on April 16.

DeWitt C. Littlejohn (R) was re-elected Speaker with 90 votes against 31 for Francis Kernan (D).

On January 16, the Legislature elected Benjamin F. Bruce (R) as Canal Commissioner, to fill the vacancy caused by the death of Commissioner-elect Samuel H. Barnes (R).

On February 5, the Legislature elected Ex-Supreme Court Justice Ira Harris (R) to succeed William H. Seward as U.S. Senator from New York for a six-year term beginning on March 4, 1861.

On February 8, Ephraim Goss (R) was elected president pro tempore of the State Senate "for this day."

On February 19, Jay Gibbons (D) asked the Assembly to appoint a Select Committee to investigate allegations that he had "corruptly solicited a consideration for his official action in regard to a bill now pending before this House, to increase the salary of the assistant district attorney of the County of Albany." Speaker Littlejohn appointed assemblymen Bingham, Tuthill (both R), Hutchings, Kernan and Taber (all three D) to this committee. Mitchell Sanford and Theophilus C. Callicot appeared for Gibbons's defence during the proceedings.

On March 7, Peter P. Murphy (R) was elected president pro tempore of the State Senate "for this day." On the same day, a Committee was appointed to "enquire and report whether it be necessary to appoint a President pro tempore, or whether the President pro tempore chosen at the previous session holds his office during the present session."

On March 12, the Committee reported that it is necessary to appoint a President pro tempore, and that the President pro tempore chosen at the previous session does not continue in office at the next session. Besides, the committee opined that a President pro tempore can only be appointed if the Lieutenant Governor is actually absent, and that the appointment ceases whenever the Lieutenant Governor returns.

On March 25, Erastus S. Prosser (R) was elected president pro tempore of the State Senate "for this day." Later on the same day, William H. Ferry (R) was elected president pro tempore of the State Senate "for the balance of the Session."

On April 3, the Select Committee's resolution to expel Jay Gibbons was adopted by a vote of 99 to 8.

State Senate

Districts

 1st District: Queens, Richmond and Suffolk counties
 2nd District: 1st, 2nd, 3rd, 4th, 5th, 7th, 11th, 13th and 19th wards of the City of Brooklyn
 3rd District: 6th, 8th, 9th, 10th, 12th, 14th, 15th, 16th, 17th and 18th wards of the City of Brooklyn; and all towns in Kings County
 4th District: 1st, 2nd, 3rd, 4th, 5th, 6th, 7th, 8th and 14th wards of New York City
 5th District: 10th, 11th, 13th and 17th wards of New York City
 6th District: 9th, 15th, 16th and 18th wards of New York City
 7th District: 12th, 19th, 20th, 21st and 22nd wards of New York City
 8th District: Putnam, Rockland and Westchester counties
 9th District: Orange and Sullivan counties
 10th District: Greene and Ulster counties
 11th District: Columbia and Dutchess counties
 12th District: Rensselaer and Washington counties
 13th District: Albany County 
 14th District: Delaware, Schenectady  and Schoharie counties
 15th District: Fulton, Hamilton, Montgomery and Saratoga counties
 16th District: Clinton, Essex and Warren counties
 17th District: Franklin and St. Lawrence counties
 18th District: Jefferson and Lewis counties
 19th District: Oneida County
 20th District: Herkimer and Otsego counties
 21st District: Oswego County
 22nd District: Onondaga County
 23rd District: Chenango, Cortland and Madison counties
 24th District: Broome, Tompkins and Tioga counties
 25th District: Cayuga and Wayne counties
 26th District: Ontario, Seneca and Yates counties
 27th District: Chemung, Schuyler and Steuben counties
 28th District: Monroe County
 29th District: Genesee, Niagara and Orleans counties
 30th District: Allegany, Livingston and Wyoming counties
 31st District: Erie County
 32nd District: Cattaraugus and Chautauqua counties

Note: There are now 62 counties in the State of New York. The counties which are not mentioned in this list had not yet been established, or sufficiently organized, the area being included in one or more of the abovementioned counties.

Members
The asterisk (*) denotes members of the previous Legislature who continued in office as members of this Legislature.

Employees
 Clerk: James Terwilliger
 Sergeant-at-Arms: James C. Clark
 Assistant Sergeant-at-Arms: George H. Knapp
 Doorkeeper: Peter Kilmer
 First Assistant Doorkeeper: Charles Johnson
 Second Assistant Doorkeeper: John H. France
 Third Assistant Doorkeeper: Caspar Walter

State Assembly

Assemblymen
The asterisk (*) denotes members of the previous Legislature who continued as members of this Legislature.

Party affiliations follow the vote for Speaker and U.S. Senator.

Employees
 Clerk:  Hanson A. Risley
 Sergeant-at-Arms: Charles D. Easton
 Doorkeeper: George C. Dennis
 First Assistant Doorkeeper: Henry Henderson
 Second Assistant Doorkeeper: Sanders Wilson

Notes

Sources
 The New York Civil List compiled by Franklin Benjamin Hough, Stephen C. Hutchins and Edgar Albert Werner (1867; see pg. 439 for Senate districts; pg. 442 for senators; pg. 450–462 for Assembly districts; and pg. 492ff for assemblymen)
 Journal of the Senate (84th Session) (1861)
 Journal of the Assembly (84th Session) (1861)
 Biographical Sketches of the State Officers and Members of the Legislature of the State of New York by William D. Murphy (1861)

084
1861 in New York (state)
1861 U.S. legislative sessions